Donald Anderson, Baron Anderson of Swansea  (born 17 June 1939) is a Welsh Labour politician, who was one of the longest-serving Members of Parliament in recent years, his service totalling 34 years. Since 2005, he has served as a Labour peer in the House of Lords.

Education
Anderson was born in Swansea and educated at the local Brynmill Primary School and Swansea Grammar School before studying at Swansea University.

Political career
He entered the House of Commons in 1966 for Monmouth until being defeated in 1970 by the Conservative John Stradling Thomas.

From 1971 to 1974, he was a resident in Kensington and Chelsea and councillor in a neighbouring borough.

He then re-entered the Commons in October 1974, as MP for Swansea East. He was sworn of the Privy Council in 2000, and retired from Parliament at the 2005 general election.

In 2003, he voted in favour of the Iraq War.

In the 2005 Dissolution Honours, he was raised to the peerage as Baron Anderson of Swansea, of Swansea in the County of West Glamorgan. He was appointed a Deputy Lieutenant of the County of West Glamorgan in January 2006. Anderson belongs to Labour Friends of Israel.

Personal life
Anderson married Dorothy Trotman in 1963 and has three sons.

  Donald Anderson, Baron Anderson of Swansea (1939–)
 Hon. Robert J Anderson (1965–)
 Hon. Hugh Jenkin D Anderson (1967–)
 Hon. Geraint Frank C Anderson (1972–)

References

External links 

1939 births
Living people
Welsh Labour Party MPs
Labour Friends of Israel
Members of the Parliament of the United Kingdom for Swansea constituencies
Alumni of Swansea University
Deputy Lieutenants of West Glamorgan
Anderson of Swansea
Members of the Privy Council of the United Kingdom
National Union of Railwaymen-sponsored MPs
Politicians from Swansea
UK MPs 1966–1970
UK MPs 1974–1979
UK MPs 1979–1983
UK MPs 1983–1987
UK MPs 1987–1992
UK MPs 1992–1997
UK MPs 1997–2001
UK MPs 2001–2005
People educated at Bishop Gore School
People educated at Liberton High School
Life peers created by Elizabeth II